Thank You Scientist is an American progressive rock band from Montclair, New Jersey. Their debut studio album Maps of Non-Existent Places was named the "Revolver Album of the Week" in October 2014. Their second album Stranger Heads Prevail was released in July 2016. Their third album Terraformer was released in June 2019.

History
Thank You Scientist was formed at the New Jersey Montclair State University's music program, when guitar player Tom Monda met saxophonist Ellis Jasenovic and trumpet player Andrew Digrius. Their musical taste for Frank Zappa, Harry Nilsson, the Beatles and Mahavishnu Orchestra would later become an influence and a seed for Thank You Scientist.

In 2009 vocalist Salvatore Marrano (former vocalist of New Jersey rock band "Hello Eden"), bass player Greg Colacino, drummer Odin Alvarez and violin player Russ Lynch joined the band, which became the original lineup for Thank You Scientist. The band self-released their The Perils of Time Travel EP in 2011, followed shortly after by their first full-length album Maps of Non-Existent Places in 2012. This album caught the attention of Claudio Sanchez, vocalist and guitarist for the progressive metal/rock group Coheed and Cambria and founder of Evil Ink Records, who brought band to the label as its first signed act. A music video for "My Famed Disappearing Act" was released in August 2014. The digital re-release of the album was on September 16, 2014.

The deal opened multiple doors for the band, which soon started touring with Periphery in 2015, and with Coheed and Cambria later that year. a 2015 tour with Periphery Bass player Greg Colacino left the band that year, and was temporarily replaced by James Robbins and later on by Cody McCorry of Karmic Juggernaut. Touring put new pressure on the band, which announced in September 2017 that Odin Alvarez, Ellis Jasenovic, and Andrew Digrius would leave the band, and were to be replaced by Faye Fadem on drums, Sam Greenfield on sax, and Joe Gullace on trumpet. In 2017 their song "Psychopomp" was included in Bluecoats Drum and Bugle Corps show "Jagged Line".

They announced their next album, Terraformer, on April 5, 2019, and released the first single off that album, "FXMLDR" (pronounced as “Fox Mulder” and inspired by the television series The X-Files), on April 13. The album was released June 14, 2019. The band also released a video for "FXMLDR" made with solar equipment and in conjunction with Bluecoats Drum and Bugle Corps.

Following a hiatus during the COVID-19 pandemic, Thank You Scientist returned to touring in fall 2021. In October the band played three sets on the Coheed and Cambria-headlined S.S. Neverender cruise, produced by Norwegian Cruise Line partner Sixthman. After the cruise, drummer Faye Fadem announced in a Facebook post on the band's official page that she was departing Thank You Scientist to focus on her music as Trust Fund Ozu, and that Kevin Grossman was taking over as drummer. A new EP Plague Accommodations was released on November 19, and the band embarked on a supporting 26-date tour of the U.S. and Canada.

Musical style
Their musical style has been described as progressive rock, progressive metal, and jazz fusion.

Members
 Salvatore Marrano – vocals (2009–present)
 Tom Monda – electric guitar, fretless guitar, shamisen, sitar, vocals, synth, producer (2009–present)
 Ben Karas – electric violin (2013–present)
 Cody McCorry – bass, theremin, saw (2015–present)
 Joe Gullace – trumpet (2017–present)
 Alex Blade Silver - saxophone (2021–present)
Kevin Grossman – drums, percussion (2021–present)

Past members
 Faye Fadem – drums (2017–2021)
 Sam Greenfield – saxophone (2017–2021)
 Ellis Jasenovic – saxophone (2009–2017)
Andrew Digrius – trumpet, flugelhorn (2009–2017)
Odin Alvarez –  drums (2009–2017)
Greg Colacino – bass (2009–2015)
 Russ Lynch – violin, viola, mandolin (2009–2013)
George Marzloff – keyboards, synths (2009–2010)
James Robbins – bass (2015)

Timeline

Discography

Studio albums

EPs

Singles

References 

American progressive rock groups
American progressive metal musical groups
Rock music groups from New Jersey